Elias L. Urquhart (January 15, 1846 – April 12, 1934) was an American businessman and politician.

Early life 
Urquhart was born in Glengarry County, Upper Canada. He lived on a farm. He emigrated to the State of New York, then Michigan in 1865 and finally Wisconsin in 1870.

Career 
He was in the lumber and timber business doing surveying and estimating. Then, he was in the real estate, insurable, and abstract businesses in Medford, Wisconsin. He was also the postmaster in Medford.

Political career 
Urquhart served on the school board and on the Taylor County Board of Supervisors and was chairman of the county board. He was sheriff of Taylor County, Wisconsin and was a Republican. From 1909 to 1915, Urquhart served in the Wisconsin State Assembly.

Personal life 
Urquhart lived in Medford, Wisconsin, Taylor County, Wisconsin. In 1934, Urquhart died in Medford, Wisconsin at the age of 88.

References

1846 births
1934 deaths
Pre-Confederation Canadian emigrants to the United States
People from Medford, Wisconsin
Businesspeople from Wisconsin
Wisconsin sheriffs
County supervisors in Wisconsin
School board members in Wisconsin
Republican Party members of the Wisconsin State Assembly
People from the United Counties of Stormont, Dundas and Glengarry